Ioan Grigore Bengliu (November 16, 1881–November 26, 1940) was a Romanian lieutenant-general. 

He was born in Târgu Jiu, Gorj County, in the Oltenia region of Romania.

From 1938 to 1940, he was Inspector-General of the Romanian Gendarmerie. After retiring, he was arrested by the Ion Antonescu-Horia Sima government, imprisoned at the Jilava prison, and subsequently assassinated by members of the Iron Guard in the 1940 Jilava massacre.

References

Romanian Gendarmerie generals
Romanian Land Forces generals
1940 deaths
1881 births
People assassinated by the Romanian Iron Guard
Romanian people who died in prison custody
Prisoners who died in Romanian detention
Prisoners murdered in custody
People murdered in Romania
People from Târgu Jiu